Callioplana is a genus of flatworm polyclads belonging to the Callioplanidae family.

References

External links 

Rhabditophora genera